Central Government Industrial Tribunal is set up by Government of India by notification in official gazette for adjudication of any issues specified in Second Schedule or Third Schedule of Constitution of India. The jurisdiction of Central Government Industrial Tribunal extends to whole of India. The Act applies for Industrial disputes relating to workmen.

History and objective 

The Central Government and respective state Governments can set up one or more Industrial Tribunals for settling cases in relation to matters of industrial disputes, by notification in the Official Gazette , for issues specified in the second or third schedule or any others relating to it.

There are 22 Central Government Industrial Tribunals across India.

Powers of  

Following are the powers of Central Government Industrial Tribunal.

i. Grant of Full and Complete Relief - Aggrieved party can be entitled full and complete relief by the court.

ii. Grant of Interim Relief - Court is granted inherent powers to grant to interim relief.

iii. Adjournment - If sufficient reasons are shown the court can adjourn cases.

iv. Enforcing Personal attendance - For deciding any issue before it the court can issue summons or proclamation and enforce attendance of any persons for deciding the same.

v. Examiner power - Any person can be examined under the oath as per the powers of Court.

vi. Compelling production of any document - For deciding any matter before it, the court can also compel the production of any object or documents relating to it.

vii. issuing Commissions - Labour courts for the purpose of examination of witnesses or documents, had been empowered with powers to issue commissions 

viii. Ex-part Proceedings - In case any party to the case fails to appear before it, the court has power to proceeding ex-parte.

ix. Resolving any other workmen grievance - The court can pass such order as it may feel just and proper after determining facts of each case after determining facts of each case for determining grievance of workmen.

Challenges 

Central Government Industrial Tribunal faces following changes:

Delay in judgements due to understaffing.

Related articles 

 Tribunals in India

References

External links 
 Official Website

Indian Tribunals
Labour law by country